GCE can mean:
 Galactic Center GeV excess
 Gas Control Equipment, GCE Group, Sweden
 General Certificate of Education
 Global citizenship education
 Google Compute Engine
 Ground combat element in the United States Marine Corps
 Guthrie Corridor Expressway, an expressway in Malaysia
 Grand canonical ensemble in statistical physics